Against the Murderous, Thieving Hordes of Peasants is a piece written by Martin Luther in response to the German Peasants' War.  Beginning in 1524 and ending in 1525, the Peasants' War was a result of a tumultuous collection of grievances in many different spheres: political, economic, social, and theological.  Martin Luther is often considered to be the foundation for the Peasants' Revolt; however, he maintained allegiance to the Princes against the violence of the rebels. Against the Murderous, Thieving Hordes of Peasants typifies Luther's reaction to the Peasants' War, and alludes to Luther's concern that he might be seen to be responsible for their rebellion.

Context

The Peasants' War 
Ignited in 1524, the Peasants' War spread across the Germanic regions of the Holy Roman Empire until its suppression in 1525.  Many factors, including changes in social and economic structures, played a role in inciting the peasants to revolt. The move from an entirely agrarian economic base during the fourteenth and fifteenth centuries served as a backdrop to the development of new social classes, ones that could not and did not coincide with the traditional feudal hierarchy.  Although initially the grievances cited by the peasants were essentially based on individual abuses on the part of government of the Church, this shifted as time went on, and would come to encompass these minor issues within a general dissatisfaction with the entire feudal order.

Luther and the peasants: reluctant inspiration 
The relationship between the Protestant Reformation and the Peasants' War has long been a subject of debate. A traditional understanding in this matter is that the Peasants' Revolt stemmed from Martin Luther's doctrine of spiritual freedom and the application of his ideas as religious justification for social and political upheaval. It is true that Luther offered useful tools to the peasants:  his focus on sola scriptura put emphasis upon the priesthood of all believers. This strengthened the idea of 'divine law', that social constructs counter to divine law could not command the allegiance of the people and justified rebellion. Perhaps also influential to the revolt was the example of Luther, as his work was a rebellion against the two most significant authorities of the era when he opposed both the Pope and the Holy Roman Emperor. It is likely that Luther's views simply coincided with the desires of the peasants, and were used for that reason.

Other religious personalities such as Huldrych Zwingli and Thomas Müntzer also influenced the peasants. Zwingli taught from 1523 onwards that in order for the gospel to be successful, secular laws needed to be transformed according to the law of God, something which corresponded neatly with what the peasants wanted. Müntzer, who would lead a peasants' army until its defeat at Frankenhausen (15 May 1525) by Imperial troops, was able to encourage them by citing scriptural passages that seemed to support rebellion against lawful authority: Luke 22:35–38 and Matthew 10:34. To a peasantry oppressed in so many ways on so many levels, the leadership of men like Müntzer and the inspiration of scripture that appeared to justify violence would make rebellion seem very tempting indeed.

Furthermore, Luther's attacks on the Roman Catholic church can be said to have inspired various groups to raise arms in revolution. Peasants related to Luther's appeals against the clergy and ideas about Christian freedom, and wished to "wreak vengeance upon all their oppressors". More powerful members of society, including burghers and lesser nobility, sought to break the power of the clergy, escape the demands of Rome, and gain financially from the confiscation of church property.

When pressure built around these revolutionary ideas, Luther had to choose a side, and he joined with loyal burghers, the nobility, and princes. In siding with lawful authority, Luther preached peaceful progress and passive resistance in such documents as To the Christian Nobility of the German Nation in 1520. He believed that there were no circumstances under which violence should be used on behalf of the Gospel with the exception of efforts against the work of Satan.

Luther and Müntzer: contrasts in leadership 
Luther stated that he did "not wish the Gospel defended by force and bloodshed.  The world was conquered by the Word, the Church is maintained by the Word, and the Word will also put the Church back into its own, and Antichrist, who gained his own without violence, will fall without violence". Around the same time as Luther preached peaceful resistance, Müntzer attacked the priesthood in violent sermons, calling for the people to rise up in arms. He too cited biblical references to justify his perspective, and asked "does not Christ say, 'I came not to send peace, but a sword'? What must you do with that sword? Only one thing if you wish to be the servants of God, and that is to drive out and destroy the evil ones who stand in the way of Gospel".

While Luther's reform ideals grew more popular by the day, Müntzer's bold ideas were politically agitating and more dangerous. Müntzer argued that the Bible was not infallible and definitive, that the Holy Spirit had ways of communicating directly through the gift of reason.

The Twelve Articles of the Christian Union of Upper Swabia 
The Twelve Articles of the Christian Union of Upper Swabia, also known as The Twelve Articles of the Black Forest, or simply The Twelve Articles for short, serves as a manifesto for the Peasants' War, although not the only one behind it. The Twelve Articles are a summary composed by Sebastian Lotzer of hundreds of other articles and grievances with the biblical references that support each point. On the surface they seem quite moderate and include: the wish to be able to elect their own pastors; collected tithes to be used only within their own communities; an end to serfdom, with a promise to obey elected and appointed rulers; the right to fish or hunt without limitation; the right to take wood as necessary; a limitation on labour due to lords; an end to traditional peasant services; reasonable rents paid to lords; fair judgements in legal cases; common lands returned to the peasants for common use; an end to the custom of heriot (the right of a lord to seize a peasant's best chattel upon his or her death); and lastly, if any of these demands can be demonstrated to be unsupported by scripture, they are null and void. The peasants wanted to hear the Gospel and live their lives accordingly, and those who could be considered enemies of the gospel were the enemies of the peasants. The idea of 'pure gospel' served as their justification. The Twelve Articles succinctly called for the end of feudalism and the strengthening of the commons, a system of communal usufruct that stood in the way of nascent capitalism.

Luther's writings

Admonition to Peace 
The peasants had used the Bible to support their grievances, and in turn, to justify their rebellion, and Luther would turn it against them. He spoke out against the peasants, specifically rebutting The Twelve Articles of the Christian Union of Upper Swabia, joining with Roman Catholics to combat the angry horde. Luther's Admonition to Peace was written to serve several functions, initially to prevent bloodshed at the hands of armed peasant groups, but also to remove the misinterpretation of scripture as justification for violence, and finally as a response to several appeals that called for his counsel.

The first section of the Admonition addresses the princes and lords, urging them to recognise the threat that the peasants represented, "not to make light of this rebellion" and asking them to be more considerate in order to avoid confrontation. He reproaches the princes, making it clear that they are to blame, stating that "we have no one on earth to thank for this disastrous rebellion except you princes and lords ... as temporal rulers you do nothing but cheat and rob the people so that you may lead a life of luxury and extravagance.  The poor common people cannot bear it any longer".

The second part addresses the peasants, and although Luther recognizes their demands as reasonable as presented in The Twelve Articles, he clearly states that they are wrong for using force in order to amend the situation.  He takes particular issue with their use of Gospel as justification. The third section acknowledges that both princes and peasants have not been acting as good Christians, reproaching them both, for if war were to ensue both groups would lose their immortal souls.

Luther's Admonition to Peace, and the later publication of Against the Murderous, Thieving Hordes of Peasants, were written in response to The Twelve Articles of the Christian Union of Upper Swabia and saw wide circulation throughout Germany. Although it is not known when Luther actually first read the Twelve Articles, it was certainly prior to 16 April 1525.

Against the Murderous, Thieving Hordes of Peasants 
Luther remained largely ignorant of the extent to which the unrest permeated the peasantry until he embarked on a tour of Thuringia with Philipp Melanchthon. It was at this time that he was able to observe firsthand the severity of the situation, peasants doing "the devil's work". He attempted to prevent further violence by preaching against it but recognised that this had little, if any, impact.

In May 1525, he wrote Against the Rioting Peasants, a title which would be harshened by printers in other cities without Luther's approval. In this publication, he severely denounced the peasants on three charges: that they had violated oaths of loyalty, which makes them subject to secular punishment; they had committed crimes contrary to their faith; and that their crimes were committed using Christ's name which was blasphemy:

Luther goes so far as to justify the actions of the Princes against the peasants, even when it involves acts of violence. He feels that they can be punished by the lords on the basis that they have "become faithless, perjured, disobedient, rebellious, murderers, robbers, and blasphemers, whom even a heathen ruler has the right and authority to punish". He even venerates those who fight against the peasants, stating that "anyone who is killed fighting on the side of the rulers may be a true martyr in the eyes of God". He closes with a sort of disclaimer, "if anyone thinks this too harsh, let him remember that rebellion is intolerable and that the destruction of the world is to be expected every hour".

Open Letter on the Harsh Book Against the Peasants 
Following the defeat of Müntzer's forces on 15 May 1525 at Frankenhausen, the peasants' war was all but over, as they now lacked leaders with political and military strengths. They felt that they had been betrayed by Luther, and criticised him accordingly for the publication of Against the Murderous, Thieving Hordes of Peasants. The Catholics pointed out that Admonition of Peace vindicated the peasants, by stating that their grievances were legitimate, but when it became clear that the peasants would lose, he deserted them in his writing Against the Murderous, Thieving Hordes of Peasants. He was urged by his friends to make a retraction, something that he steadfastly refused to do.

After a few months, he decided to write a formal explanation, in an open letter to Caspar Muller, entitled An Open Letter on the Harsh Book Against the Peasants. He defends his previous writings, and states that it is the duty of a Christian to "suffer injustice, not to seize the sword and take to violence". He defends the 'harshness' that he used, stating that "a rebel is not worth rational arguments, for he does not accept them. You have to answer people like that with a fist, until the sweat drips off their noses".

He also states that the princes were too severe in their punishment of the peasants and would be punished by God for their behaviour. With this document it became clear that Luther was a socially conservative man, who would not threaten secular authority.

Aftermath: Luther and Protestantism 
Luther saw that violent upheaval would alienate the princes, nobility and certain towns, and would likely be crushed by Catholic or Imperial opposition. Since the majority of the burghers wanted moderate reform, and many of the princes were committed to it, it was a logical position. Luther would be chastised for his views, was seen as a shill to the princes, and was even stoned in Orlamünde.

References

Further reading

Primary sources 

Martin Luther (1525).  Admonition to Peace.
Martin Luther (1525).  An Open Letter on the Harsh Book Against the Peasants.
Sebastian Lotzer (1525).  The Twelve Articles of Upper Swabia.

Secondary sources 
Bax, E. Belfort.  The Peasants War in Germany: 1525–1526.  New York: Russell & Russell, 1968.
Blickle, Peter, ed.  The Revolution of 1525: The German Peasants’ War from a New Perspective.  Baltimore: The Johns Hopkins University Press, 1981.
Engels, Frederick.  The German Revolutions: The Peasants War in German and Germany: Revolution and Counter-Revolution.  London: The University of Chicago Press, 1967.
Engels, Frederick.  The Peasants War in Germany.  Moscow: Foreign Languages Publishing House, 1956.
Hsia, R. Po-Chia, ed.  The German People and the Reformation.  London: Cornell University Press, 1988.
Oman, Charles.  A History of the Art of War in the Sixteenth Century.  London: Metheun, 1937.
Scott, Tom and Bob Scribner, eds.  The German Peasants’ War: A History in Documents.  New Jersey: Humanities Press International, 1991.
Scribner, Bob and Gerhard Benecke, eds.  The German Peasant War of 1525: New Viewpoints.  Boston: George Allen & Unwin, 1979.
Tappert, Theodore G., ed.  Selected Writings of Martin Luther: 1523–1526. Philadelphia, Pennsylvania: Fortress Press, 1967.

1525 books
1525 in the Holy Roman Empire
16th-century Christian texts
Peasant revolts
German Peasants' War
Works by Martin Luther